"Wifey" is a song by American R&B trio Next. The song was written by Eddie Berkeley, Keir Gist, band member Robert "RL" Huggar, and singer Lil' Mo for the group's second studio album, Welcome II Nextasy (2000). The song was released as the album's lead single on May 8, 2000. "Wifey" peaked at number one on the US Billboard Hot R&B/Hip-Hop Singles & Tracks chart while reaching number seven on the Billboard Hot 100. It also entered the top 20 in New Zealand and the United Kingdom. In 2001, the song won an AWARD Rhythm & Soul Award for in the Award-Winning R&B/Hip-Hop Songs category.

Music video 
Directed by Jeff Richter, the video shows imagery of the band members treating their significant women with care as the video cuts to a stage where the guys along with three female dancers appear and perform on the stage. It then shows each member of the group attracting a woman ranging from velvet ropes outside a club, the bedroom and in the bathroom when the woman soaks in the bathtub.

Track listings 

US and European CD single
 "Wifey" (radio mix) – 4:05
 "Wifey" (instrumental) – 4:05

US maxi-CD single
 "Wifey" (radio mix) – 4:05
 "Wifey" (instrumental) – 4:05
 "Jerk" (club mix featuring 50 Cent) – 3:47
 "Jerk" (TV track featuring 50 Cent) – 3:47
 "Wifey" (a cappella) – 3:40

US 12-inch single
A1. "Wifey" (album mix) – 4:05
A2. "Wifey" (instrumental) – 4:05
A3. "Wifey" (a cappella) – 3:45
B1. "Jerk" (club mix featuring 50 Cent) – 3:46
B2. "Jerk" (radio mix featuring 50 Cent) – 3:46
B3. "Jerk" (TV track featuring 50 Cent) – 3:46

UK CD single
 "Wifey" – 4:03
 "Wifey (DYNK vocal mix featuring Easy) – 5:22
 "Wifey (DYNK 4 dub) – 5:22

UK 12-inch single
A1. "Wifey" – 4:02
A2. "Wifey (DYNK vocal mix) – 5:30
B1. "Wifey (DYNK vocal mix featuring Easy) – 5:22
B2. "Wifey (DYNK 4 dub) – 5:09

German CD single
 "Wifey" (radio mix) – 4:10
 "Jerk" (featuring 50 Cent) – 3:46
 "Wifey" (instrumental) – 4:07
 "Too Close" – 4:19

Credits and personnel 
Credits are adapted from the liner notes of Welcome II Nextasy.
 Eddie Berkeley – writing, production
 Raphael "Tweety" Brown – vocals
 Terry "T-Low" Brown – vocals
 Robert "R.L." Huggar – writing, vocals
 KayGee – mixing, production, writing
 Adam Kudzin – mixing
 Lil' Mo – writing, additional vocals
 Shane Stoneback – engineering assistance

Charts

Weekly charts

Year-end charts

Certifications

Release history

References 

2000 singles
2000 songs
Arista Records singles
Lil' Mo songs
Music videos directed by Jeff Richter
Songs written by Lil' Mo
Songs written by KayGee